Kobla Mensah Wisdom Woyome is a Ghanaian politician and member of the Seventh Parliament of the Fourth Republic of Ghana representing the South Tongu in the Volta Region on the ticket of the National Democratic Congress.

Early life and education 
Woyome was born on 21 September 1971. He hails from Dabala a town in the South Tongu District of the Volta Region of Ghana. Woyome is a graduate of the Presbyterian Boys' Secondary School and Sixth Form Science College, Legon. Woyome completed his Bachelors of Science degree in Computer Science and Statistics at the University of Ghana, Legon in 1997. He also had his postgraduate diploma in business administration at the Ghana Institute of Management and Public Administration (GIMPA).

Career 
Kobla Mensah was the chief executive officer of the Stewise group of companies from 2009 until he became the MP for South Tongu.

Political life 
He was a minority member of the 6th parliament of the 4th republic of Ghana. He was appointed to the Youth, Sports and Culture Committee as a ranking member. He was also a member of the Foreign Affairs Committee and Standing Order committee.

Personal life 
Kobla Mensah Wisdom Woyome is identified as a Christian and a member of Action Chapel International. He is married with three children.

References 

Ghanaian MPs 2009–2013
Ghanaian MPs 2013–2017
Ghanaian MPs 2017–2021
1971 births
Living people
National Democratic Congress (Ghana) politicians
Ghanaian MPs 2021–2025